Horodiştea may refer to several villages in Romania:

 Horodiştea, a village in Păltiniș, Botoșani commune, Botoşani County
 Horodiştea, a village in Cotnari commune, Iaşi County

See also 
 Horodiște (disambiguation)